The men's C-1 500 metres event was an open-style, individual canoeing event conducted as part of the Canoeing at the 1996 Summer Olympics program.

Medallists

Results

Heats
17 competitors were entered. The top two finishers in each heat moved on to the final with the others were relegated to the semifinals.

Semifinals
Two semifinals were held with the top two finishers of each semifinal and the fastest third-place finisher advancing to the final.

Final
The final took place on August 4.

Doktor won his second gold medal by making his move at the 350 meter mark. Defending Olympic champion Bukhalov's disqualification was not disclosed in the official report.

References
1996 Summer Olympics official report Volume 3. p. 171. 
Sports-reference.com 1996 C-1 500 m results.
Wallechinsky, David and Jaime Loucky (2008). "Canoeing: Men's Canadian Singles 500 Meters". In The Complete Book of the Olympics: 2008 Edition. London: Aurum Press Limited. p. 479.

Men's C-1 500
Men's events at the 1996 Summer Olympics